Esmeralda–Yaruro or Takame–Jarúroan, is a proposed connection between two unclassified languages of Venezuela and Ecuador: Yaruro (Llaruro, Pumé, Yuapín), 6000 speakers, and the extinct Esmeralda (Esmeraldeño, Takame). They would be only distantly related, but Kaufman (1990) finds the connection convincing, and Campbell (2012) believes the connection is promising.

References

 
Indigenous languages of South America
Languages of Venezuela
Proposed language families